The 2014 UEFA European Under-19 Championship elite round was the second round of qualification for the 2014 UEFA European Under-19 Championship final tournament.
The 27 teams advancing from the first qualification round plus Spain, who received a bye to the elite round, were distributed into seven groups of four teams, with one of the teams in each group hosting all six matches in a round-robin format. The seven group-winning teams qualified automatically for the final tournament in Hungary.

Seeding
The draw for the elite round was held at the UEFA headquarters in Nyon, on 28 November 2013.  Each team was placed in one of four drawing pots, according to their qualifying round results. The seven sides with the best records were seeded in Pot A, and so forth until Pot D, which contained the seven teams with the weakest records. During the draw, each group was filled with one team from every pot, taking into account that teams that played each other in the first qualifying round could not be drawn into the same group again.

Tiebreakers
If two or more teams were equal on points on completion of the group matches, the following criteria were applied to determine the rankings.
 Higher number of points obtained in the group matches played among the teams in question
 Superior goal difference from the group matches played among the teams in question
 Higher number of goals scored in the group matches played among the teams in question
 If, after applying criteria 1) to 3) to several teams, two teams still had an equal ranking, criteria 1) to 3) would be reapplied to determine the ranking of these teams. If this procedure did not lead to a decision, criteria 5) and 6) would apply
 Results of all group matches:
 Superior goal difference
 Higher number of goals scored
 Drawing of lots
Additionally, if two teams which had the same number of points, goals scored and goals conceded played their last group match against each other and were still equal at the end of that match, their final rankings were determined by means of a penalty shoot-out. This procedure was applicable only if a ranking of the teams was required to determine the group winner.

Groups
The hosts of the seven mini-tournament groups are indicated below.

All times are CEST (UTC+02:00).

Group 1

Group 2

Group 3

Group 4

Group 5

Group 6

Group 7

Qualified teams

1 Only counted appearances for under-19 era (bold indicates champion for that year, while italic indicates hosts)

References

External links
UEFA.com

Uefa European Under-19 Football Championship Elite Round, 2014
Elite round
UEFA European Under-19 Championship qualification